Nelson Martin (born August 24, 1958 in Toronto, Ontario) is a former Canadian Football League defensive back and currently a mortgage agent for Trillium Mortgage Services in Toronto. He played for seven seasons with the BC Lions where he won the 73rd Grey Cup in 1985 and won the Dr. Beattie Martin Trophy as the West Division's most outstanding Canadian. He played College football for the Simon Fraser Clan.

References

External links
Canadian Football League

1958 births
BC Lions players
Canadian football defensive backs
Simon Fraser Clan football players
Simon Fraser University alumni
Living people
Players of Canadian football from Ontario
Canadian football people from Toronto